The Deseret Peak Utah Temple is a temple of the Church of Jesus Christ of Latter-day Saints under construction in Tooele, Utah. Plans to construct a temple in Tooele Valley were announced on April 7, 2019 by church president Russell M. Nelson, during the church's general conference. The temple will be the first in Tooele County and the 21st in the state of Utah.

The Deseret Peak Utah Temple will be located on the corner of 2400 North and 400 West in Tooele. The temple was originally announced as the "Tooele Valley Utah Temple" and was to be located in Erda, at the intersection of Erda Way and State Route 36. The change came after community pressure to not include some of the other intended residential development, and locals threatened a referendum to alter the area's zoning. The relocated temple plans are expected to follow the same design as previously announced, with three stories and about 70,000 square feet. A 20,000-square-foot meetinghouse will be built adjacent to the temple.

See also

 The Church of Jesus Christ of Latter-day Saints in Utah
 Comparison of temples of The Church of Jesus Christ of Latter-day Saints
 List of temples of The Church of Jesus Christ of Latter-day Saints
 List of temples of The Church of Jesus Christ of Latter-day Saints by geographic region
 Temple architecture (Latter-day Saints)

References 

Temples (LDS Church) in Utah